Neville Bennett (1 June 1928 – 1 May 2015) was a New Zealand cricketer. He played in six first-class matches for Canterbury from 1950 to 1952.

See also
 List of Canterbury representative cricketers

References

External links
 

1928 births
2015 deaths
New Zealand cricketers
Canterbury cricketers
Cricketers from Christchurch